Krasnoyarsk State Pedagogical University named after V. P. Astafyev (KSPU) is a public university located in the city of Krasnoyarsk, Russia, one of the oldest and largest in Siberia. Founded in 1932 as a pedagogical institute. Received university status in 1993. Today it is one of the largest universities in Krasnoyarsk along with the Siberian Federal University and the Reshetnev Siberian State University of Science and Technology.

History

KSPU was founded in 1932 by the Decree of the Council of People's Commissars of the RSFSR No. 289 as the Krasnoyarsk State Pedagogical Institute. The institute had four departments, which accepted 118 students, as well as 50 students of the working faculty. It was located in the building of the former women's gymnasium. Its historical predecessor is considered to be the Krasnoyarsk Institute of Public Education, which existed in Krasnoyarsk in 1920–1924 and was attached to the Irkutsk Institute of Public Education.

In 1935, a correspondence department was opened at KSPI. The Teachers' Institute was also created in the structure of the KSPI.

In 1982, KSPI was awarded the Order of the Badge of Honour.

In December 1994, the Institute was transformed into the Krasnoyarsk State Pedagogical University.

Since 1999, the writer Viktor Astafyev has been an honorary professor of the KSPU.

Since January 28, 2004, the Krasnoyarsk State Pedagogical University has been named after him.

In 2005, the university entered the top 100 universities in Russia. It was also awarded the European Quality of Education medal.

The scientists of KSPU achieved the greatest success in archeology, zoology, history, Russian language, pedagogy, sociology, physics, chemistry and philosophy.

References

Literature 
 Большой энциклопедический словарь Красноярского края [Great Encyclopedic Dictionary of the Krasnoyarsk Krai] / гл. ред. А. П. Статейнов. Красноярск : Буква С, 2010. Т. 2 : [Административно-территориальное деление. Населенные пункты. Предприятия и организации]. pp. 190–191. 515 p. (in Russian).

External links 
 Official site

Universities in Krasnoyarsk Krai
Educational institutions established in 1932
Krasnoyarsk
1932 establishments in Russia
Teachers colleges in Russia
Universities and institutes established in the Soviet Union